In differential geometry, Yau's conjecture from 1982, is a mathematical conjecture which states that a closed Riemannian 3-manifold has an infinite number of smooth closed immersed minimal surfaces. It is named after Shing-Tung Yau. It was the first problem in the minimal submanifolds section in Yau's list of open problems.

The conjecture has recently been claimed by Kei Irie, Fernando Codá Marques and André Neves in the generic case, and by Antoine Song in full generality.

References

Further reading
 (Problem 88)

Conjectures
Unsolved problems in geometry
Differential geometry